Esmail Halali (born on August 13, 1973 in Tabriz) is an Iranian retired football player and current manager of Mes Soongoun.

Playing career

Club career
He began his professional career with Tractor in 1989 and was promoted to the first-team squad in 1992. After the relegation of Tractor in 1995, he left the team and joins to Persepolis. He played for Perseopolis seven season but was sell to Sanat Naft at the end of the 2001–02 season. He also played at the Paykan, Esteghlal Ahvaz, Shahrdari Bandar Abbas (in Azadegan League) and Shahin Bushehr in the next years. He announced his retirement in July 2008 to starting his coaching period.

International career
He was invited to the national team by Tomislav Ivić when he was played for Persepolis. He has 15 caps at the Iran national football team and also was part of the team in 2000 AFC Asian Cup.

Coaching career
He was started his coaching career just months after his retirement at his beloved club, Persepolis as Hossein Abdi's assistant in B team. After Abdi resigned, he was named as the B team's head coach by chairman Habib Kashani on 1 July 2010. Under his management, Persepolis won the Tehran Provincial League and was promoted to the 3rd Division. They also won the Tehran Hazfi Cup at the same season and made a Double, the first B team to doing so.

Statistics

Honours

As a player
Tractor
Hazfi Cup: 1993–94 (Runner-up)

Persepolis
Iranian league (5): 1995–96, 1996–97, 1998–99, 1999–2000, 2001–02
 Runner-up: 2000–01
Hazfi Cup (1): 1998–99

As a manager
Persepolis B
Tehran provincial league (1): 2011–12
Tehran Hazfi Cup (1): 2011–12

References

External Links

1973 births
Living people
Iranian footballers
Iran international footballers
2000 AFC Asian Cup players
Persepolis F.C. players
Esteghlal Ahvaz players
Paykan F.C. players
Tractor S.C. players
Shahin Bushehr F.C. players
Sanat Naft Abadan F.C. players
Machine Sazi F.C. players
Shahrdari Bandar Abbas players
Sportspeople from Tabriz
Association football midfielders